Jose Arturo Vásquez Machado was governor of Cabañas department in the Republic of El Salvador from 1994–2003.

Background
He was elected to the post in 1994 and held that position until 2003. During his tenure as governor, Arturo Vasquez served under the administrations of president's Armando Calderón Sol and Francisco Flores. After serving as governor, he dedicated his time to his family and community as an active citizen in the city of Sensuntepeque.

During the night of November 9, 2009, Arturo Vasquez was taken to an emergency room in San Salvador where he died from wounds that he sustained in an attack perpetrated by unknown individuals. On the morning of November 12, 2009, the Legislative Assembly of El Salvador held a moment of silence to honor the former governor.

See also
List of unsolved murders

References

2000s murders in El Salvador
2003 crimes in El Salvador
2003 murders in North America
2009 deaths
People from Cabañas Department
People murdered in El Salvador
Salvadoran murder victims
Salvadoran politicians
Unsolved murders in El Salvador
Year of birth missing